Janowiec Szlachecki is a settlement in the administrative district of Gmina Janowiec Kościelny, within Nidzica County, Warmian-Masurian Voivodeship, in northern Poland.

References

Janowiec Szlachecki